In computing, the AMIga Window Manager (amiwm) is a stacking window manager for the X Window System written by Marcus Comstedt.

The window manager emulates the Amiga Workbench and includes support for multiple virtual screens like the AmigaOS, but doesn't offer more functionality than standard Workbench. By the words of its author, "the purpose of amiwm is to make life more pleasant for Amiga-freaks like myself who has/wants to use UNIX workstations once in a while". AmiWM was not updated for years since the 1998 release, yet Linux Format magazine rated it as fast and reliable in 2007. Although Marcus Comstedt included new features like support for AmigaOS 3.5 icons during internal development, a new version was not released until 2010.

Features 
Features of the amiwm window manager include:
  Supports iconification of running tasks
 Window borders
 Window titlebars
 Titlebar buttons for menu, minimize, maximize, and close
 Desktop shortcuts

Notes

References

External links 
amiwm homepage
amiwm's official github
xwinman.org page on Amiwm
amiwm patch to make it look like Amiga OS 1.x

X window managers